Rotar may refer to:

Rotar (Masters of the Universe)
A unique custom car design by Ed Roth
Rotari, Transnistria, a commune in the Camenca sub-district of Transnistria, Moldova

People with the surname
Igor Rotar (born 1965), Russian journalist

See also 

Rotaru
Rotari (disambiguation)